In ancient Greece and during the Byzantine era, the Promachoi (singular: Promachos; Greek: πρόμαχος) were the men fighting in the first rank of the phalanx. The word can also be used as an adjective as in "promachos line" referring to the first line of battle.

The first use of the word is recorded in Homer's Iliad. An obsolete English literal translation of promachos is forefighter, in Dutch voorvechter.

Name 
 Promachos (Πρόμαχος), a young man from Knossos.

Sanctuaries - Statues 
 Athena Promachos, the famous bronze statue by Phidias that towered over the Parthenon.
 Hermes Promachos, a sanctuary at Tanagra was dedicated to him.
 Heracles Promachos, a white marble statue of Heracles in the Heracles Sanctuary at Thebes. The Thebans Xenocrites (Ξενοκρίτης) and Eubius (Εὔβιος) created the statue.

References

Ancient Greek military terminology
Byzantine titles and offices
Greek words and phrases
Greek masculine given names
Phalanx
Ancient Greek infantry types